Shovel is the second studio album by noise rock band Feedtime, released in 1986 by Aberrant Records.

Track listing

Personnel 
Adapted from the Shovel liner notes.

feedtime
Rick Johnson – vocals, guitar
Al Larkin – bass guitar, vocals
Tom Sturm – drums
Additional musicians
Holy Roller Gospel Choir – choir (A6)
Adrian Hornblower – saxophone (B7)

Production and design
Alex – illustrations
Yvonne Duke – photography
feedtime – mixing, design
Guru – photography
Isabel – photography
Minda – illustrations
Jonathan Summers – engineering, mixing

Release history

References

External links 
 

1986 albums
Feedtime albums